Einar Dahl may refer to:

 Einar Dahl (Esperantist) (1904–1979), Swedish Esperantist
 Einar Dahl (politician) (1880–?), Norwegian barrister and politician